"Veni Creator Spiritus" (Come, Creator Spirit) is a traditional Christian hymn believed to have been written by Rabanus Maurus, a ninth-century saint German monk, teacher, and archbishop. When the original Latin text is used, it is normally sung in Gregorian Chant. It has been translated and paraphrased into several languages, and adapted into many musical forms, often as a hymn for Pentecost or for other occasions that focus on the Holy Spirit.

Liturgical use

As an invocation of the Holy Spirit, Veni Creator Spiritus is sung in the Catholic Church during liturgical celebrations on the feast of Pentecost (at both Terce and Vespers). It is also sung at occasions such as the entrance of Cardinals to the Sistine Chapel during a papal conclave, as well as at the consecration of bishops, the ordination of priests, the sacrament of Confirmation, the dedication of churches, the celebration of synods or councils, the coronation of monarchs, the Red Mass marking the start of the judicial year, the profession of members of religious institutes, and other similar solemn events. There are also Catholic traditions of singing the hymn on New Year's Day to gain a plenary indulgence.

Martin Luther used the hymn as the basis for his Pentecost chorale "", first published in 1524.

Veni Creator Spiritus is also widely used in Anglican liturgies, where it has appeared since the publication of the 1550 ordinal and continues to appear, for example, in the ordinal of the 1662 Book of Common Prayer, and in the Novena to The Holy Ghost in Saint Augustine's Prayer Book (1947). The translation "Come Holy Ghost, our souls inspire" was by Bishop John Cosin in 1625, and has been used for all subsequent British coronations. Another English example is "Creator Spirit, by whose aid", written in 1690 by [George Washington
] and published in The Church Hymn Book (1872, n. 313).

Text
Many variations exist. The following Latin and English versions were recently published by the Vatican:

Notable English translations
Since the English Reformation in the 16th century, there have been more than fifty English-language translations and paraphrases of Veni Creator Spiritus. The version attributed to Archbishop Cranmer, his sole venture into English verse, first appeared in the Prayer Book Ordinal of 1550. It was the only metrical hymn included in the Edwardian liturgy. In 1561 John Day included it after the psalms in his incomplete metrical psalter of that year. From 1562 onwards, in The Whole Booke of Psalmes, Day printed Cranmer's version at the start of the metrical paraphrases. In terms of concision and accuracy, Cranmer compares poorly with Luther. Cranmer's sixth stanza, which mentions the Last Judgement and religious strife within Christendom ("the last dreadful day... strife and dissension..."), was a new addition, with no parallel in the Latin original or in Luther's version.

The version included in the 1662 revision of the Book of Common Prayer compressed the content of the original seven verses into four (with a two-line doxology), but retained the Latin title. It was written by Bishop John Cosin for the coronation of King Charles I of Great Britain in 1625. The same words have been used at every coronation since, sung by the choir after the Creed and before the Anointing. The first verse is:

Come, Holy Ghost, our souls inspire,
and lighten with celestial fire.
Thou the anointing Spirit art,
who dost thy sevenfold gifts impart.

Another well-known version by the poet John Dryden was first published in his 1693 work, Examen Poeticum. It may be sung to the tune "Melita" by John Bacchus Dykes, and excerpts of the Dryden text have been set to the German hymn tune "Lasst uns erfreuen". Dryden's first verse is:

Creator Spirit, by whose aid
The world's foundations first were laid,
Come, visit every pious mind;
Come, pour thy joys on humankind;
From sin and sorrow set us free,
And make thy temples worthy thee.

German paraphrases 
Martin Luther wrote a paraphrase in German, "Komm, Gott Schöpfer, Heiliger Geist" (literally: Come, God Creator, Holy Ghost) as a Lutheran hymn for Pentecost, first published in 1524, with a melody derived from the chant of the Latin hymn. It appears in the Protestant hymnal Evangelisches Gesangbuch as EG 126.

Heinrich Bone published his own German paraphrase in 1845, "Komm, Schöpfer Geist, kehr bei uns ein" (literally: Come, Creator Spirit, visit us), also using an adaptation of the plainchant melody. It appears in the German Catholic hymnal Gotteslob (2013) and its 1975 predecessor.

A rhymed German translation or paraphrase, "Komm, Heiliger Geist, der Leben schafft" (literally: Come, Holy Spirit who creates life), was written by Friedrich Dörr to a melody close to the Gregorian melody, published in 1972. It became part of the common German Catholic hymnal Gotteslob in 1975, and of its second edition in 2013, as GL 342 in the section "Pfingsten – Heiliger Geist" (Pentecost – Holy Spirit).

Musical settings

Over the centuries, Veni Creator Spiritus has inspired the following works by notable composers, in approximate chronological order:
 Jehan Titelouze, Veni creator (1623)
 Guillaume-Gabriel Nivers, "L'hymne de la Pentecôte" in his 2e Livre d'Orgue (1667)
 Marc-Antoine Charpentier, 5 settings:
Veni creator Spiritus, H.54, for 3 voices (or chorus), 2 violins and continuo (1670s)
Veni creator Spiritus, H.66, for soloists, chorus, flutes, bassoons, strings and continuo (1680s)
Veni creator Spiritus, H.69, for 1 voice and continuo (1680s)
Veni creator Spiritus, H.70, for 1 voice and continuo (late 1680s)
Veni creator Spiritus, H.362, for 3 voices and continuo (early 1690s?)
 Michel-Richard Delalande, Veni creator Spiritus S 14 (1689) or S 14 bis (1684)
 Johann Pachelbel, chorale prelude for organ, on "Komm, Gott Schöpfer, Heiliger Geist" (1693)
 Nicolas de Grigny, Veni creator en taille à 5, fugue à 5 for organ (5 versets) (1699)
 Henry Desmarest, Veni creator, for soloists, chorus and orchestra (early 1700s)
 Johann Gottfried Walther, chorale prelude for organ, on "Komm, Gott Schöpfer, Heiliger Geist" (early 1700s)
 Johann Sebastian Bach harmonized "Komm, Gott Schöpfer, Heiliger Geist" for his four-part chorale BWV 370, and also used the tune as the basis for his chorale prelude for organ BWV 631 (1708–1717), which he later extended as BWV 667 (1750).
 Charles-Hubert Gervais, Veni creator (1723)
 Ferdinando Bertoni, Veni creator (1765)
 François Giroust, Veni creator à 4 voix et orchestre (1787)
 Camille Saint-Saëns, Veni creator à 4 voix (1858)
 Hector Berlioz, Veni creator à cappella H 141 (c.1861–1868), a motet for women's voices to the Latin text 
 César Franck, Veni creator for two voices (TB) and organ, FWV 68 (1876)
 Anton Bruckner harmonized the original tune for voice and organ as his motet WAB 50 (c. 1884).
 Augusta Holmès, Veni creator for tenor and mixed chorus, IAH 74 (1887)
 Alexandre Guilmant, organ works in L'Organiste liturgiste, Op. 65, Book 1 (1884) and Book 10 (1899)
 Gustav Mahler set the Latin text to music in Part I of his Symphony No. 8 in E-flat major (1906).
 Filippo Capocci, Organ Fantasia on Veni Creator Spiritus (1907)
 Maurice Duruflé used the chant tune as the basis for his symphonic organ composition "Prélude, Adagio et Choral varié sur le thème du Veni Creator", Op. 4 (1926/1930). 
 Karol Szymanowski, Veni creator for soprano, mixed chorus, organ and orchestra, Op. 57 (1930)
 Marcel Dupré, "Komm, Gott Schöpfer, Heiliger Geist" among his organ settings of 79 Chorales, Op. 28, No. 46 (1931), and Veni creator in the organ suite Le Tombeau de Titelouze, Op. 38, No. 8 (1942)
 Jeanne Demessieux, Veni creator, Toccata for Organ (1947)
 Zoltán Gárdonyi, Partita for Organ Veni creator spiritus (1958)
 Paul Hindemith concluded his Concerto for Organ and Orchestra with a Phantasy on Veni Creator Spiritus (1962).
 Krzysztof Penderecki wrote a motet for mixed choir (1987).
 Cristóbal Halffter set the text for chorus and orchestra (1992).
 Petr Eben Toccata for  Piano after Grogorian chant Veni creator spiritus
 Karlheinz Stockhausen used the text in the second hour of his Klang cycle (2005), in a piece for two singing harpists titled Freude (Joy), Op. 82.
 Arvo Pärt, Veni creator (2006) 
 Zsolt Gárdonyi, Toccata for Organ Veni creator spiritus (2020)

References

External links

 Gregorian Chant: free downloads
 Pastoral Commentary by Pope John Paul II

9th century in music
Latin-language Christian hymns
Latin religious words and phrases
State ritual and ceremonies
Hymns for Pentecost